Hellbound and Heartless is the second studio album from Vampires Everywhere!. The album was released on June 19, 2012 via Century Media and Hollywood Waste Records.

Reception
Hellbound and Heartless has received mixed to negative reviews, with their new direction mostly derided by fans and critics for its similarity to Marilyn Manson, with Decoy Music deeming it "nothing more than a deliberate, cheap, rip-off of what Marilyn Manson did 15 years ago".

Track listing

Personnel
Michael Vampire - vocals 
Aaron Graves - rhythm guitar, & bass guitar
DJ Black - lead guitar, & bass guitar

References

2012 albums
Vampires Everywhere! albums